Muro-Ami may refer to:

Muro-ami, a fishing technique
Muro-Ami (film), a 1999 Filipino film